Bethlehem College or Bethlehem Campus may refer to:

 Bethlehem College, Ashfield, a girls' school in New South Wales, Australia
 Bethlehem Campus, a campus of several Christian educational institutions, Bethlehem, New Zealand

See also 
 Bethlehem University, Bethlehem, Palestine